Stopy života is a Czech television programme which was first broadcast from 2013 to 2015 on TV Prima and TV Barrandov. In total, nineteen parts were created in two seasons. The pilot episode was broadcast in December 2013 on TV Prima. The rest of the series was broadcast during 2014 and 2015 on TV Barrandov. It was followed by Doktorka Kellerová.

Cast
Ivana Andrlová as Kateřina Vernerová (season 1)
Kateřina Brožová as Lýdie Kellerová
Kristýna Fuitová Nováková as  Eva Weissová
Tomáš Magnusek as Viktor Weiss
Miroslav Vladyka as Jiří Verner (season 1)
Marek Vašut as Marek Keller
Valentina Thielová as Jiřina Kainarová (season 1, guest in season 2)
Jan Kačer as Otakar Kainar (season 1)
Kateřina Macháčková as Věra Tilerová (season 2, guest season 1)
Pavlína Němcová as Třísková (season 2)
Aleš Cibulka as Walek (season 2)
Ladislav Frej as Jan Tiler (season 2, guest season 1)
Milan Kňažko as Keller st. (season 2)

References

External links 
 CSFD.cz - Stopy života
 

2013 Czech television series debuts
Czech drama television series
Prima televize original programming
TV Barrandov original programming